APFO may refer to:

Adequate Public Facilities Ordinance
Aerial Photography Field Office
Ammonium Perfluorooctanoate
Association of Principal Fire Officers
Association of Programs for Female Offenders
Asia & Pacific Field Office
Africa Peace Forum